A list of animated television series first aired in 1986.

See also
 List of animated feature films of 1986
 List of Japanese animation television series of 1986

References

Television series
Animated series
1986
1986
1986-related lists